Chanambam Ibomcha College, Bishnupur, established in 1965, is a general degree college in Bishnupur, Manipur. It offers undergraduate courses in science and arts. It is affiliated to  Manipur University.

Departments

Science
Physics
Chemistry
Mathematics
Environmental Science
Botany
Zoology

Arts
Manipuri
English
History
Geography
Political Science
Philosophy
Economics
Education

Accreditation
The college is recognized by the University Grants Commission (UGC).

See also
List of institutions of higher education in Manipur

References

External links
http://www.cicollege.in/

Colleges affiliated to Manipur University
Educational institutions established in 1965
Universities and colleges in Manipur
1965 establishments in Manipur